Tim Haars (born 6 November 1981 in 's-Hertogenbosch, Netherlands) is a Dutch actor and presenter. He appeared in more than twenty films since 2008.

Selected filmography

References

External links 

1981 births
Living people
Dutch male film actors
21st-century Dutch people